Norraphat Vilaiphan, also called Bright or Brightnorr, is a Thai actor working for The One Enterprise Company Limited. He was born on 23 December 1997. Two of his well-known works include Dokkeawkalong, as well as Nattaya Thongsen.

He graduated Suankularb Wittayalai Rangsit School and studied in Sirindhorn International Institute of Technology As of 2022, he studies at Bangkok University.

Filmography

Television dramas
 2018 Sai Ruk Sai Sawaat 2018 (สายรักสายสวาท) (The One Enterprise/One 31) as Thana (ธนา มหทรัพย์) (Cameo)
 2018 Song Kram Nak Pun (สงครามนักปั้น) (The One Enterprise/One 31) as Norraphat Vilaiphan (Bright) (นรภัทร วิไลพันธุ์ (ไบร์ท)) (Cameo)
 2020 Jao Mae Asorapit (อสรพิษ) (The One Enterprise/One 31) as เจ้าไชยะวงศ์ (อดีต) / สารัช (ปัจจุบัน) (Prince Chaiyawong (Past) / Sarath (Present)) with Plengkwan Nattaya Thongsaen & Wannarot Sonthichai
 2021 Ley Luang (เล่ห์ลวง) (The One Enterprise/One 31) as Fin (อรุษ เอื้อดำรงค์ (ฟิน)) with Thikamporn Ritta-apinan & Fonthip Watcharatrakul 
 2021 Hongsutai Maai Layk 6 (ห้องสุดท้ายหมายเลข 6) (The One Enterprise-Por Dee Kam/One 31) as Pole star / Psychopomp (ดาวเหนือ / ยมทูต) with Plengkwan Nattaya Thongsaen (Cameo)
 2022 Phit Rak Roi Adeet (พิษรักรอยอดีต) (The One Enterprise/One 31) as Chayodom (Cho) (ชโยดม (โช)) with Marie Broenner
 2022 Dtai Laah (ใต้หล้า) (The One Enterprise/One 31) as Hiran Khaokhulab (Ran) (หิรัญ เขากุหลาบ (รัญ)) with Raviyanun Takerd

Television series
 2016 I Was Born In the Reign of Rama IX: The Series (เราเกิดในรัชกาลที่ ๙ เดอะซีรีส์ ตอน ดุจแสงทองส่อง) (The One Enterprise/One 31) as People (ประชาชน) (Cameo)
 2018 Mueng Maya Live The Series Part 5: Game Gon Maya (เมืองมายา Live ตอน เกมกลมายา) (The One Enterprise/One 31) as  Anuta / Tai (อนุธา นทีประเสริฐ (ไทม์)) with Lanlalin Tejasa Weckx

Television sitcom
 2020 Pen Tor (เป็นต่อ ตอน ขุนทวงแค้น) (The One Enterprise/One 31) as Khun (ขุน (วัยรุ่น)) (Cameo)

MC
 Online 
 20 : On Air YouTube: Brightnorr Channel

References

External links 

 

Norraphat Vilaiphan
Norraphat Vilaiphan
Living people
1997 births
Norraphat Vilaiphan
Norraphat Vilaiphan
Norraphat Vilaiphan
Norraphat Vilaiphan